Cuatrecasas is a surname. Notable people with the surname include:

 José Cuatrecasas (1903–1996), Spanish botanist
 Pedro Cuatrecasas (born 1936), American biochemist